First Community Bank (FCB), is a commercial bank in Kenya, the largest economy in the East African Community. It is licensed by the Central Bank of Kenya, the central bank and national banking regulator.

Overview
, the bank's total assets were valued at about US$187.62 million (KES:18.762 billion), with shareholders' equity of about US$14 million (KES:1.46 billion), and customer deposits of US$161 million (KES:16.126 billion). At that time, the bank was ranked number 21, by assets, out of 43 licensed banks in Kenya then.

History
First Community Bank was established in 2007 according to Sharia law by private Muslim investors in Kuwait, Kenya and Tanzania. The bank received a Kenyan commercial banking license the same year, and started operations in June 2008. The FCB is the first Kenya-based bank to operate according to the laws of Sharia. Since the founding of First Community Bank, another Sharia bank, the Gulf African Bank, has also received a commercial license from the Central Bank of Kenya.

Subsidiaries
The bank's first subsidiary is FCB Takful Insurance Agency, in which it maintains 100% shareholding. The insurance agency was established in 2010. The bank also owns a second subsidiary, FCB Capital Limited, the first Sharia-compliant Investment Bank in Kenya. It also is wholly owned by First Community Bank.

Branch network
, the bank maintains a network of branches at the following locations:

 Wabera Street Branch - Prudential Assurance Building, Wabera Street, Nairobi
 Eastleigh Branch I - United Textile Building, First Avenue, Eastleigh, Nairobi
 Eastleigh Branch II - General Warungu Street, Eastleigh, Nairobi
 Industrial Area Branch - Enterprise Road, Nairobi
 Kimathi Street Branch - Jamia Mosque, Nairobi
 Westlands Branch - Mpaka Plaza, Mpaka Road, Westlands, Nairobi
 South C Branch - South C Shopping Center, Nairobi
 Garissa Branch - Bajweed Building, Wajir Road, Garissa
 Lunga Lunga Branch - Lunga Lunga Road, Industrial Area, Nairobi
 Kisumu Branch - CAC House, Oginga Odinga Street, Kisumu
 Nakuru Branch - Merica Hotel Building, Kenyatta Avenue, Nakuru
 Malindi Branch - Malindi Shopping Complex, Lamu Road, Malindi
 Mombasa Branch I - Shah Mansion Building, Digo Road, Mombasa
 Mombasa Branch II - Imara Building, Digo Road, Mombasa
 Moyale Branch - Shariff Guest House, Moyale
 Wajir Branch - Mandera Road, Wajir
 Mihrab Branch- FCB Mihrab Building, Lenana Road Nairobi
 Isiolo Branch- White House Building, Moyale-Isiolo Road Isiolo
 Bondeni Branch- Bat-Haf Plaza, Abdel Nasser Road Mombasa
 AMAL Branch- Amal Plaza, Eastleigh First Avenue Nairobi

Governance
The bank is governed by Board of Directors. Sheikh Mohamed Mbaye, one of the non-Executive Directors, is the Chairman of the Board. The Chief Executive Officer is Dr. Hussein Assad Ahmed Hassan.

See also
CBK
Kenya Banks
Kenya Economy
Sharia Banking
Gulf African Bank

References

External links
 Website of First Community Bank
Website of Central Bank of Kenya

Banks of Kenya
2007 establishments in Kenya
Banks established in 2007
Companies based in Nairobi